ICGV Baldur is a patrol and survey vessel of the Icelandic Coast Guard. The ship was built by Vélsmiðja Seyðisfjarðar in Iceland in 1991 and entered service the same year. Over its three decade career it has been used for hydrographic surveying, patrol, law enforcement, exercises and various other projects along the country's shores. The ship is named after the Norse god Baldur and is the third coast guard vessel to bear the name.

See also
ICGV Baldur (II)

References

External links 
 Profile on Icelandic Coast Guard website

Ships built in Iceland
1991 ships
Ships of the Icelandic Coast Guard